Comin' At Ya! is the second album by the former Santana and Azteca band member Coke Escovedo. It was produced by Patrick Gleeson and released in 1976.

Track listing
"Diamond Dust / Vida" - (Brian Holland, Coke Escovedo) - 3:03
"Something So Simple" - (Mark Phillips, Glenn Symmonds) - 2:34
"Stay With Me" - (José Feliciano) - 3:16
"Hangin' On" - (Mark Phillips) - 3:18
"Somebody's Callin'" - (Glenn Symmonds) - 3:05
"The Breeze and I" - (Al Stillman, Ernesto Lecuona) - 1:42  
"Runaway" - (Errol Knowles) - 2:44
"I Wouldn't Change a Thing" - (Johnny Bristol) - 4:31 
"Backseat" - (Dewayne Sweet, Glenn Symmonds) - 3:39 	
"Everything is Coming Our Way" - (Carlos Santana) - 3:59  
"Fried Neck Bones and Home Fries" - (Melvin Latise, William Correa) - 2:15

Personnel
Coke Escovedo - Percussion, congas, vocals
Glenn Symmonds - Drums
Mark Philipps - Bass
Gábor Szabó, Abel Zarate  - Guitar
Frank Mercurio - Keyboards
Joe Henderson - Tenor Saxophone
Nathan Rubin and the San Francisco Soul Strings - Strings
Errol Knowles - Lead vocals
The Waters Sisters - Backing vocals

Charts

Album

Sampling

A sample of about five seconds of the electric guitar on "Hangin' On" is used prominently on the song "Fastlane" by King Geedorah (MF Doom).

References

External links
 Coke Escovedo-Comin' At Ya! at Discogs

1976 albums
Coke Escovedo albums
Mercury Records albums